

Events
 The Greek tragic poet Phrynicus wins his first theatrical contest in Athens.

Births

Deaths
 Emperor Annei of Japan, according to legend.

References

6th century BC
510s BC